The Dutch Hockey Hall of Fame located in the Netherlands serves to honor those individuals that have contributed to the sport of ice hockey in the Netherlands.

See also

External links
Dutch Hockey Hall of Fame official website

Ice hockey museums and halls of fame
Ice hockey in the Netherlands
Halls of fame in the Netherlands
Dutch sports trophies and awards